Michael Beaumont may refer to:
Michael Beaumont (politician) (1903–1958), British Conservative politician
Michael Beaumont, 22nd Seigneur of Sark (1927–2016), Seigneur of Sark from 1974